Alfred William Lawson (March 24, 1869 – November 29, 1954) was an English born professional baseball player, aviator and utopian philosopher. He was a baseball player, manager, and league promoter from 1887 through 1916 and went on to play a pioneering role in the U.S. aircraft industry. He published two early aviation trade journals.

He is frequently cited as the inventor of the airliner and was awarded several of the first air mail contracts, which he ultimately could not fulfill. He founded the Lawson Aircraft Company in Green Bay, Wisconsin, to build military training aircraft and later the Lawson Airplane Company in South Milwaukee, Wisconsin, to build airliners.

The crash of his ambitious Lawson L-4 "Midnight Liner"  during its trial flight takeoff on May 8, 1921, ended his best chance for commercial aviation success.

In 1904, he wrote a utopian novel, Born Again, in which he developed the philosophy which later became Lawsonomy.

Baseball career (1888–1907)

He made one start for the Boston Beaneaters and two for the Pittsburgh Alleghenys during the 1890 season. His minor league playing career lasted through 1895. He later managed in the minors from 1905 to 1907.

Union Professional League
In 1908, he started a new professional baseball league known as the Union Professional League. The league took the field in April but folded one month later owing to financial difficulties.

Aviation career (1908–1928)
An early advocate or rather evangelist of aviation, in October 1908 Lawson started the magazine Fly to stimulate public interest and educate readers in the fundamentals of the new science of aviation. It sold for 10 cents a copy from newsstands across the country. In 1910, moving to New York City, he renamed the magazine Aircraft and published it until 1914. The magazine chronicled the technical developments of the early aviation pioneers.

Lawson was the first advocate for commercial air travel, coining the term "airline." He also advocated for a strong American flying force, lobbying Congress in 1913 to expand its appropriations for Army aircraft.

In early 1913, he learned to fly the Sloan-Deperdussin and the Moisant-Bleriot monoplanes, becoming an accomplished pilot. Later that year he bought a Thomas flying boat and became the first air commuter regularly flying from his country house in Seidler's Beach, New Jersey, to the foot of 75th Street in New York City (about 35 miles).

In 1917, utilizing the knowledge gained from ten years of advocating aviation, he built his first airplane, the Lawson Military Tractor 1 (MT-1) trainer, and founded the Lawson Aircraft Corporation. The company's plant was sited at Green Bay, Wisconsin. There he secured a contract and built the Lawson MT-2. He also designed the steel fuselage Lawson Armored Battler, which never got beyond the drafting board, given doubts within the Army aviation community and the signing of the armistice.

After the war, in 1919 Lawson started a project to build America's first airline. He secured financial backing, and in five months he had built and demonstrated in flight his biplane airliner, the 18-passenger Lawson L-2. He demonstrated its capabilities in a 2000-mile multi-city tour from Milwaukee to Chicago-Toledo-Cleveland-Buffalo-Syracuse-New york City-Washington, D.C.-Collinsville-Dayton-Chicago and back to Milwaukee, creating a buzz of positive press.

The publicity allowed him to secure an additional $1 million to build the 26-passenger Midnight Liner. The aircraft crashed on takeoff on its maiden flight.

In late 1920, he secured government contracts for three airmail routes and to deliver ten war planes, but owing to the fall 1920 recession, he could not secure the necessary $100,000 in cash reserves called for in the contracts and had to decline them.

In 1926, he started his last airliner, the 56-seat, two-tier Lawson super airliner.

In this phase of his life, he was considered one of the leading thinkers in the budding American commercial aviation community, but his troubles with getting financial backing for his ideas led him to turn to economics, philosophy, and organization.

Lawsonomy (1929–1954)
In the 1920s, Lawson promoted health practices, including vegetarianism, and claimed to have found the secret of living to 200. He also developed his own highly unusual theories of physics, according to which such concepts as "penetrability", "suction and pressure" and "zig-zag-and-swirl" were discoveries on par with Einstein's theory of relativity. He published numerous books on these concepts, all set in a distinctive typography.

He later propounded his own philosophy, Lawsonomy, and the Lawsonian religion. He also developed, during the Great Depression, the populist economic theory of "Direct Credits", according to which banks are the cause of all economic woes, the oppressors of both capital and labour. Lawson believed that the government should replace banks as the provider of loans to business and workers. He predicted the worldwide adoption of Lawsonian principles once "everybody understands this subject". His rallies and lectures attracted thousands of listeners in the early 1930s, mainly in the upper Midwest, but by the late 1930s the crowds had dwindled.

His claims about his own greatness became increasingly hyperbolic. The Lawsonomy trilogy, considered by Lawson himself to be his intellectual masterpiece, is full of such self-referential statements as "About every two thousand years a new teacher with advanced intellectual equipment appears upon earth to lead the people a step or two nearer the one God of everybody".

In 1943, he founded the Humanity Benefactor Foundation and University of Lawsonomy in Des Moines, on the site of Des Moines University, to spread his teachings and offer the degree of "Knowledgian", but after various IRS and other investigations it was closed and finally sold in 1954, the year of Lawson's death. His financial arrangements remain mysterious to this day, and in later years he seems to have owned little property, moving from city to city as a guest of his farflung acolytes. In 1952, he was brought before a United States Senate investigative committee on allegations that his organization had bought war surplus machines and then sold them for a profit, despite claiming non-profit status. His attempt to explain Lawsonomy to the senators ended in mutual frustration and bafflement.

A farm near Racine, Wisconsin, is the only remaining university facility, although a tiny handful of churches may yet survive in places such as Wichita, Kansas. A storm in the spring of 2009 destroyed the sign, although the supporting posts are still visible. On the northbound side of Interstate 94, a sign on the roof of the building nearest the freeway said "Study Natural Law" until being shingled over in October 2014.

In 2018, the Town of Mount Pleasant paid $933,000 to purchase the property on the northbound side of Interstate 94 for the Foxconn project. All remaining buildings were demolished and removed.  Lawsonomy maintains a small following to this day.

See also
 List of topics characterized as pseudoscience

References

Further reading
 Henry, Lyell D. Zig-Zag-and Swirl: Alfred W. Lawson's Quest for Greatness. Iowa City: University of Iowa Press, 1991.
 Kossy, Donna. Kooks: A Guide to the Outer Limits of Human Belief. 2nd ed. Los Angeles: Feral House, 2001. 
 Kuntz, Jerry. Baseball Fiends and Flying Machines: The Many Lives and Outrageous Times of George and Alfred Lawson. Jefferson, North Carolina: McFarland Publishing, 2009.
 Lawson, Alfred. Lawsonomy, vols. 1-3. Detroit: Humanity Benefactor Foundation, 1935–1939.

External links

 
 
 
 
 Lawson Demo Flight Departed 93 Years Ago at Wisconsin Aviation Hall of Fame
 What in the heck is the University of Lawsonomy? – article about Lawson in a Milwaukee-area magazine
 End of flight – newspaper article about 1921 loss of first Lawson Airliner 
 "ASME Milwaukee – History & Heritage" 
 
 The Alfred W. Lawson papers at the American Heritage Center

1869 births
1954 deaths
Lawsonomy
Boston Beaneaters players
Pittsburgh Alleghenys players
Major League Baseball pitchers
19th-century baseball players
Bloomington Blues players
Wilmington Blue Hens players
Harrisburg Ponies players
Oakland Colonels players
Pendleton Ho Hos players
Spokane Bunchgrassers players
Atlanta Firecrackers players
Troy Trojans (minor league) players
Sandusky Sandies players
Albany Senators players
Pawtucket Maroons players
Norfolk Clams players
Norfolk Crows players
Sportspeople from London
Minor league baseball managers
Major League Baseball players from the United Kingdom
Major League Baseball players from England
English baseball players
Fitchburg (minor league baseball) players
Cobleskill Giants players